Hera is a space mission in development at the European Space Agency in its Space Safety program. Its primary objective is to study the Didymos binary asteroid system that was impacted by DART and contribute to validation of the kinetic impact method to deviate a near-Earth asteroid in a colliding trajectory with Earth. It will measure the size and the morphology of the crater created by and momentum transferred by an artificial projectile impacting an asteroid, which will allow measuring the efficiency of the deflection produced by the impact.

The spacecraft will be launched in October 2024 and will also study the results of DART impactor, four years after NASA's mission. DART impacted the asteroid Dimorphos, the smaller of two objects forming the binary asteroid 65803 Didymos, on 27 September 2022.

Hera has a mass of 1128 kilograms and carries a payload of cameras, an altimeter, and a spectrometer. It will also carry two nano-satellite CubeSats, called Milani and Juventas.

Hera will fully characterise the composition and physical properties of the binary asteroid system including, for the first time, the sub-surface and internal structures. It will also perform technological demonstrations linked to operations in the vicinity of a small body and the deployment and the communication with CubeSats in interplanetary space.

Project history

AIDA the joint project with NASA 

AIDA is the first operational program whose objective is to test a method of deflecting near-Earth asteroids. It was set up in 2013 jointly by scientists supported by NASA and ESA. Its objective is to test the use of an impactor-type device to deflect an asteroid that might strike the Earth. This program provides for the launch to the binary asteroid (65803) Didymos of two spacecraft: the DART impactor developed by NASA responsible for crashing at high speed on the smaller of the two asteroids and the AIM orbiter developed by ESA, which must measure the effects of the impact. After an evaluation phase in the two space agencies, the European Space Agency decided at the end of 2016 to abandon the development of AIM due to lack of sufficient financial support from member states. NASA, for its part, decided to continue the development of DART. In this new context, terrestrial observatories are responsible for taking over partially the role of AIM. The DART project will evolve thereafter by incorporating the LICIACube nano-satellite, released before the impact and responsible for taking and retransmitting the first 100 seconds of it.

Renaissance of the European project 
In 2017, at the request of several member states of the European Space Agency, the latter resumed the studies of a replacement for AIM that was named Hera (named after the Greek goddess of marriage Hera). Hera must fulfill all the objectives assigned to AIM, but in the meantime optimizing all the components of the mission as much as possible. Hera shall be launched in October 2024 and study the effects of the DART impact on Dimorphos, the satellite of Didymos, 4 years after it occurred. The Hera mission was eventually approved by the ESA Ministerial Council in November 2019. In September 2020 the European Space Agency entrusted the construction of the spacecraft to a consortium of companies led by OHB, under a contract of 129.4 million euros. It also formalized the scientific team of the mission, made up of a principal investigator, a scientific council, four working groups covering all aspects of the mission and the scientific managers of the instruments.

Goals 

The main objective of the Hera mission is to evaluate the kinetic impactor method for deflecting a near-Earth object that threatens to crash into Earth. This method consists of modifying the trajectory of the asteroid by launching a spacecraft at a speed of a few kilometers per second. Of all the methods, this is the most mature because it relies on the use of available and inexpensive spacecraft technologies. To fulfill this objective, Hera must determine:

 how much momentum transfer depends on the density, porosity and characteristics of the asteroid's surface and internal structure and
 what proportion of the kinetic energy is transferred in the fragmentation and restructuring of the asteroid or in the kinetic energy of the ejected materials.

Hera also has high scientific objectives. It must collect the characteristics of the two asteroids: surface characteristics, internal porosity and internal structure. In particular, Hera will be the first mission to measure the subsurface and internal structures of an asteroid. For this, it will use the JuRA low-frequency radar on board the CubeSat Juventas (see below). The entire moon, Dimorphos, will be mapped with a spatial resolution of a few meters and the vicinity of the impact with a resolution of 10 centimeters. The mass of the moon of Didymos will be estimated with high accuracy, allowing a direct estimate of the momentum transfer efficiency from DART impact.

The mission also includes several technological objectives. The most important thing is the production of a guidance software which, by using data from several sensors, will make it possible to reconstruct the surrounding space and thus to independently define a safe trajectory around the asteroid. Hera must also embark two CubeSats which will be dropped once the asteroid is reached. These CubeSats are:

 Milani, with the mission of collecting spectral data from the surface of the two asteroids (surface composition) and identifying the presence of dust in the surrounding space and
 Juventas, which must carry out subsurface and internal structure measurements, contribute to the determination of the gravity field and provide information on the mechanical response of the surface when landing on Dimorphos.

Conduct of the mission 
The American DART mission, launched on 24 November 2021 at 06:21 UTC by a Falcon 9 from Vandenberg Launch Station reached the binary asteroid (65803) Didymos on 26 September 2022, with impact at 23:16 UTC colliding with its Dimorphos satellite at a relative speed of about 6.6 km/s. The impact must change the rotation period (11.9 hours) of Dimorphos around Didymos by 73 seconds minimum, which should be observed by terrestrial telescopes.

Hera is to be launched in October 2024 by an Falcon 9 rocket which will take off from Cape Canaveral and reach the binary asteroid (65803) Didymos four years after DART, precisely on 28 December 2026, to begin six months of investigation. Hera will be the first to make a rendezvous with a binary asteroid. Once close to the double asteroid, five stages will follow:

 the early characterization phase,
 the deployment phase of the two nano-satellites,
 the detailed characterization phase,
 the close observation phase,
 the landing of both Milani and Juventas on Dimorphos, and finally, an experiment that could end with a landing on Didymos of the main spacecraft.

Spacecraft 
The Hera mission includes the eponymous main satellite and two CubeSats named Juventas and Milani.

The Hera satellite is cubic in shape, 1.6 × 1.6 × 1.7 meters and has a mass of approximately 1128 kg. Its energy is provided by solar panels with an area of 13 m². It includes an inter-satellite link to communicate with the two nano-satellites.

The satellite is stabilized on 3 axes. The attitude is maintained by 4 reaction wheels, gyroscopes, star trackers, solar sensors and two Asteroid Framing Cameras (AFC). Attitude guidance is through the Planetary Altimeter (PALT).

Scientific instruments

Asteroid framing cameras (AFC) 
The main instruments of Hera are the two AFC cameras (Asteroid Framing Cameras), developed by the company JenaOptronik. Identical and redundant, they each have a FaintStar panchromatic sensor of 1020 x 1020 pixels with a telephoto lens. The field of view is 5.5 x 5.5 degrees and the spatial resolution reaches one meter at a distance of 10 kilometers. These cameras are to provide physical characteristics of the surface of the asteroid Didymos and Dimorphos as well as the crater created by DART and the Juventas landing zone.

Hyperspectral imager – Hyperscout-H 
Hyperscout-H is a hyperspectral imager that must provide images in a spectral range between 665 and 975 nm (visible and near infrared). The instrument makes its observations in 25 distinct spectral bands. It is developed by  cosine Remote Sensing. This is a specific version developed for Hera, different from the standard Hyperscout.

Planetary altimeter (PALT) 
PALT is a micro-Lidar planetary altimeter using a laser emitting an infrared light beam at 1.5 microns. Its track on the ground is 1 meter at an altitude of 1 kilometer (1 milliradian). The altitude measurement accuracy is 0.5 meters. Its frequency is 10 Hertz.

Thermal Infrared Imager (TIRI) 
TIRI is a thermal infrared imager provided by the Japanese Space Agency. The spectral range observed is between 7 and 14 microns and it has 6 filters. Its visual range is 13.3 x 10.6°. The spatial resolution is 2.3 meters at a distance of 10 kilometers.

X-Band Radio Science (X-DST) 
The mass of the two asteroids making up the binary system, the characteristics of their gravity field, their rotational speed and their orbits will be measured using radio wave disturbances caused by the Doppler effect. The measurements relate to the radio exchanges between Hera and Earth stations but also between Hera and the CubeSats. Due to the low orbit in which the CubeSats will circulate, these last measurements are crucial to determine the gravity of Didymos.

Instrumentation on board the two nano-satellites 
Two CubeSat type nano-satellites, named Milani and Juventas, are transported by Hera and released before arrival in the asteroidal system (65803) Didymos. They are responsible for carrying out investigations that complement those of their carrier ship.

Both CubeSats are built around a similar platform. These are 6U-XL CubeSats with a mass (including propellant) of approximately 12 kilograms. They are 3-axis stabilized and have a cold gas propulsion system. They communicate with the mothership in S-band. The Doppler effect affecting radio links is used to measure the characteristics of the gravitational field of the binary system. They have a visible light camera and star trackers which are used to determine the dynamic variations of Didymos. Finally, the two CubeSats are equipped with accelerometers which will be used to determine the properties of the surface of Dimorphos if the CubeSats land on its surface as planned at the end of their mission. Juventas is developed by GomSpace while Milani is made by Tyvak International.

CubeSat Milani 
The CubeSat Milani aims to take images and measure the characteristics of the possibly present dust. It must map the two asteroids forming the binary asteroid (65803) Didymos, characterize their surface, evaluate the effects of the DART impact, contribute to the measurements of the gravitational field of the asteroids and determine the characteristics of the dust clouds possibly located around the asteroids.

To fulfill these objectives, it carries two instruments:

 The ASPECT hyperspectral imaging spectrometer is the main instrument. It works in visible and near infrared light (0.5 to 2.5 microns). Its spatial resolution is 2 meters at 10 kilometers and its spectral resolution is less than 40 nanometers (20 nanometers in the visible). It has a total of 72 channels.
 The VISTA thermogravimeter is responsible for detecting dust (5 to 10 microns), volatiles (such as water) and light organic materials.

CubeSat Juventas 
Juventas aims to determine the geophysical characteristics of Dimorphos. The probe must map its gravity field and determine its internal structure as well as the characteristics of its surface.

To fulfill these objectives, it carries the following instruments:

 The JuRa radar operating in the 50–70 MHz frequency with a spatial resolution of 10 to 15 meters. It is the first instrument to probe the inner layers of an asteroid. It uses two dipole antennas with each branch measuring 1.5 meters. Each measurement session can last up to 45 minutes. It occupies a volume of less than 1U and its mass is less than 1300 grams.
 The GRASS gravimeter whose dynamic range is 5 x 10−4 and sensitivity is 5 x 10−7. Its mass is less than 380 grams.
 A camera.
 The radio link with the mother ship (measurement of the Doppler effect).

See also 
 Planetary Defense Coordination Office

References

Bibliography

External links 
 Hera mission by Côte d'Azur Observatory
 Hera mission by European Space Agency
 Hera and Planetary Defense, COSPAR 2021, P. Michel, 4 February 2021.
 Science return of Hera, COSPAR 2021, P. Michel, 2 February 2021.
 Youtube channel of the NEO-MAPP project.
 The Planetary Science Journal, volume 3, number 7, 2022, July, 15th.

Proposed European Space Agency spacecraft
Missions to minor planets
Missions to asteroids
2024 in spaceflight